Sara Kragulj (born 26 October 1996) is a Slovenian rhythmic gymnast.

She represented her country at the 2013 Mediterranean Games, where she placed 9th All-Around. She competed at the 2013 European Championships - and ended on 28th place All-Around, 48th with Hoops (14.516), 27th with Ball (15.666), 45th with Clubs (14.000) and 42nd with Ribbon (14.433) - and at the 2015 European Championships - and ended on 19th place in Team competition (together with Špela Kratochwill and Monija Čebašek), 40th with Hoop (14.800), 34th with Ball (15.700) and 46th with Clubs (14.533).

Routine music information

References

External links
 https://database.fig-gymnastics.com/public/gymnasts/biography/26258/false?backUrl=

Living people
1996 births
Sportspeople from Ljubljana
Slovenian rhythmic gymnasts
Competitors at the 2013 Mediterranean Games
Mediterranean Games competitors for Slovenia
Competitors at the 2019 Summer Universiade